The 2011–12 Football League 2 was the 29th season since the official establishment of the third tier of Greek football in 1983. It is scheduled to start on 27 November 2011.
23 teams are separated into two groups, 11 in Group 1 (South) and 12 in Group 2 (North) according to geographical criteria.

Southern Group

Teams

Standings

Results

Northern Group

Teams

Standings

Results

Playoffs

Tie-break match

Relegation play-off

Promotion play-offs
The promotion play-offs will comprise the teams ranked 2nd and 3rd from both groups during the regular season, and they are scheduled to take place immediately after the conclusion of the regular season.

References

Third level Greek football league seasons
3
Greece